Web Call Server is unified intermedia server software developed by Flashphoner. It is a server-side platform, implemented in Java, dedicated for streaming video over wide range of communication protocols, including:
 browsers ( Chrome, Firefox, Opera, Safari, Microsoft Edge, Internet Explorer), 
 VoIP online conference services, 
 softphones, 
 SIP switches, 
 IP cameras,
 streaming servers software, i.e. Adobe Flash Media Server and Wowza Streaming Engine.
Web Call Server can be configured for operation in networks with various topology, e.g. working behind corporate NAT and serving external clients using public IP address.

History 

2010 - Created an extension / plugin for Wowza Media Server, which allows you to work with SIP.

2011 – Had made design to replace the Wowza Media Server with self developed software  based on RTMFP protocol, which was at that time the most advanced protocol streaming video with minimal delay. As a result was created RTMFP SIP Gateway, which allowed to make SIP calls from a browser with support for Flash Player.

2013 - The rapid development of WebRTC  technology made to implement support of this technology. As a result, version Web Call Server 3  supported both protocols (WebRTC and RTMFP) for SIP calls from a browser. In Chrome, Firefox, and  Opera browsers calls began to stream directly from the browser without Flash Player.

2015 – Based on the modern technological basis was issued Web Call Server 4  version,  which  allowed not only to make SIP calls, but also to use the product in a video streaming server mode and broadcasts. There were two sets of options: calls and streaming video. Block 'call' was responsible for the integration with the SIP, and 'streaming' block  - for standard  video streaming functions, such as the publication of an arbitrary number of video streams, playback of video streams from the server, security, etc.

2016 - In addition to RTMP and WebRTC  have been added support for new additional  protocols and case studies: Websockets protocol for streaming to iOS Safari, RTSP protocol broadcasts from IP cameras and distribution streams, RTMP protocol for publishing SIP-calls on the CDN network, WebRTC-record calls, iOS SDK, and official support for Amazon EC2 servers. All of these innovations have been combined into a version of Web Call Server 5.

Formats, Protocols, Codecs 

Supported in the current release 
 Formats
 HTML5 / Websockets
 WebRTC
 Flash
 REST
 JSON
 Protocols
 SIP 
 RTP
 RTSP
 HTTP/HTTPS
 Codecs
 Audio codecs - G.711, Opus, Speex, G.722, G.729
 Video codecs - VP8, H.264

See also 
 Wowza Streaming Engine
 Red5 (media server)
 Jitsi

References

External links
 Flashphoner RTMP SIP Gateway - Wowza Community
 Flashphoner Web Call Server 3 Offers Flash and WebRTC Server Support
 Flashphoner Releases Update to Web Call Server 4
 camera ip
 http://telecomreseller.com/2015/01/15/flashphoner-merges-browser-sip-telephony-and-webrtc-streaming-in-a-software-platform-web-call-server-4/
 FlashPhoner - FusionPBX
 
 We have rolled out the fifth version of streaming video and web telephony platform Web Call Server 5 | Streaming Video WebRTC server and SIP gateway for browsers and mobile apps
 WebRTC Cookbook

Media servers
Streaming software